Savoy is the fifth album from the Norwegian group of the same name, released October 30, 2004, in Norway. Like their two previous releases, there was a regular edition and limited edition. However, this time, the limited edition bonus CD has been substituted by a DVD containing the video for "Isotope". The song "Whalebone" appears in the critically acclaimed film Hawaii, Oslo.

Track listing
All songs written by Paul Waaktaar-Savoy and Lauren Savoy.
 "Empty of Feeling"
 "Girl One"
 "Bovine"
 "Whalebone"
 "Shooting Spree"
 "Melanie Lied to Me"
 "Watertowers"
 "Is My Confidence Reeling?"
 "Rain on Your Parade"
 "Cyna"
 "The Breakers"
 "Isotope"

Personnel
Paul Waaktaar-Savoy – Lead vocals, guitars, bass, keyboards, programming, arrangements
Lauren Savoy – Lead vocals, rhythm guitar, backing vocals
Maya Vik – Bass, backing vocals
Frode Unneland – Drums, backing vocals
Jimmy Gnecco - Backing vocals ("Shooting Spree"), lead vocals ("The Breakers")

Charts

References

External links
Album listing on old Savoycentral.com page

2004 albums
Savoy (band) albums